In graph theory, the Edmonds matrix  of a balanced bipartite graph  with sets of vertices  and  is defined by 

 

where the xij are indeterminates. One application of the Edmonds matrix of a bipartite graph is that the graph admits a perfect matching if and only if the polynomial det(Aij) in the xij is not identically zero.

The Edmonds matrix is named after Jack Edmonds. The Tutte matrix is a generalisation to non-bipartite graphs.

References

Algebraic graph theory